The following is a partial list of the "V" codes for Medical Subject Headings (MeSH), as defined by the United States National Library of Medicine (NLM).

This list continues the information at List of MeSH codes (V01). Codes following these are found at List of MeSH codes (V03). For other MeSH codes, see List of MeSH codes.

The source for this content is the set of 2006 MeSH Trees from the NLM.

– publication formats (publication type)

– abbreviations (publication type)

– abstracts (publication type)

– academic dissertations (publication type)

– account books (publication type)

– addresses (publication type)
  – lectures (publication type)
  – sermons (publication type)

– advertisements (publication type)

– almanacs (publication type)

– anecdotes (publication type)

– animation (publication type)

– annual reports (publication type)

– architectural drawings (publication type)

– atlases (publication type)

– bibliography (publication type)
  – biobibliography (publication type)

– biography (publication type)
  – interview (publication type)
  – personal narratives (publication type)

– book reviews (publication type)

– broadsides (publication type)

– caricatures (publication type)

– cartoons (publication type)

– catalogs (publication type)
  – price lists (publication type)

– charts (publication type)

– chronology (publication type)

– classical article (publication type)

– collected works (publication type)
  – collected correspondence (publication type)
  – festschrift (publication type)

– collections (publication type)

– comment (publication type)

– congresses (publication type)
  – overall (publication type)

– corrected and republished article (publication type)

– database (publication type)

– diaries (publication type)

– dictionary (publication type)
  – phrases (publication type)
  – terminology (publication type)

– directory (publication type)

– documentaries and factual films (publication type)

– duplicate publication (publication type)

– editorial (publication type)

– encyclopedias (publication type)

– ephemera (publication type)
  – advertisements (publication type)
  – letter (publication type)
  – posters (publication type)
  – programs (publication type)
  – prospectuses (publication type)

– essays (publication type)

– eulogies (publication type)
  – funeral sermons (publication type)

– exhibitions (publication type)

– fictional works (publication type)

– forms (publication type)

– government publications (publication type)

– guidebooks (publication type)

– guideline (publication type)
  – practice guideline (publication type)

– handbooks (publication type)

– historical article (publication type)
  – biography (publication type)
  – classical article (publication type)
  – festschrift (publication type)

– humor (publication type)
  – cartoons (publication type)

– indexes (publication type)

– instruction (publication type)
  – examination questions (publication type)
  – lecture notes (publication type)
  – nurses' instruction (publication type)
  – problems and exercises (publication type)
  – programmed instruction (publication type)

– journal article (publication type)
  – review (publication type)

– laboratory manuals (publication type)

– legal cases (publication type)

– legislation (publication type)

– letter (publication type)

– manuscripts (publication type)

– meeting abstracts (publication type)

– monograph (publication type)
  – textbooks (publication type)

– news (publication type)

– newspaper article (publication type)

– outlines (publication type)

– overall (publication type)
  – festschrift (publication type)

– patents (publication type)

– periodical index (publication type)

– periodicals (publication type)

– pharmacopoeias (publication type)
  – herbals (publication type)

– pictorial works (publication type)
  – drawings (publication type)
  – maps (publication type)
  – portraits (publication type)

– popular works (publication type)
  – juvenile literature (publication type)
  – patient education handout (publication type)

– published erratum (publication type)

– resource guides (publication type)

– retracted publication (publication type)

– retraction of publication (publication type)

– review (publication type)
  – consensus development conference (publication type)
  – consensus development conference, NIH (publication type)

– statistics (publication type)

– tables (publication type)

– technical report (publication type)

– unedited footage (publication type)

– union lists (publication type)

– unpublished works (publication type)

The list continues at List of MeSH codes (V03).

V02